EFA may refer to: England Football Association

Arts 
 European Film Academy, a trade organisation 
 European Film Awards, organized by the European Film Academy
 European Festivals Association, an arts festival organisation

Commerce
 Electricity Forward Agreement, on the electricity market
 European Finance Association
 Expedited Funds Availability Act, of the United States Congress
 IShares MSCI EAFE, an exchange-traded fund

Education
 French School at Athens
 Education Funding Agency, now part of the Education and Skills Funding Agency of the Government of the United Kingdom
 Elmira Free Academy, a high school in upstate New York
 Education For All, an initiative of UNESCO

Military
 EFA (mobile bridge), used by the French military
 European Fighter Aircraft, now the Eurofighter Typhoon

Science and technology
 Elementary function arithmetic
 Essential fatty acid
 Exploratory factor analysis

Sport
 Egyptian Football Association
 Eton Fives Association, the governing body for Eton Fives in England

Other uses
 Efai language
 Electronic Frontiers Australia, an Australian privacy organization
 Endometriosis Foundation of America
 Environmental Foundation for Africa, an African environmental organization
 Euro First Air - Canarias Cargo, a defunct Spanish airline
 European Free Alliance, a European political coalition
 Express Freighters Australia, an Australian airline
 Eyes For Africa Charity, a medical charity